The Elks Club, also known as Community House, is a historic fraternal society clubhouse at 67 West Main Street  in Marianna, Arkansas.  It is a two-story brick building, built in 1911 by S. A. Keedy, a local contractor.  It has an irregular layout, with a two-story main block and a side single-story wing with a porch on its flat roof.  The main entry is centered in the two-story block, sheltered by a porch supported by brick posts and Doric columns.  It was built for the local chapter of the Benevolent and Protective Order of Elks, who occupied it until financial constraints force its sale in 1934.  It was acquired by the city in exchange for the payment of the outstanding mortgage, and was first occupied by the city library, with its second floor ballroom used as a community function space.  The space occupied by the library is now used by the local chamber of commerce.

The building was listed on the National Register of Historic Places in 1979.

See also

National Register of Historic Places listings in Lee County, Arkansas

References

Clubhouses on the National Register of Historic Places in Arkansas
Buildings and structures completed in 1911
Buildings and structures in Lee County, Arkansas
Elks buildings
National Register of Historic Places in Lee County, Arkansas